Mailbird is a desktop email client (email management application) for Windows 7, 8, 10, and 11 for sending and receiving emails, managing calendar events and contacts from different email providers, including Outlook, Gmail, Yahoo Mail, etc. Social media, task management, file share, and video-conferencing integrations are also included.

History
The first version of the Mailbird email software was created in January 2012 by Danish co-founders and serial entrepreneurs Michael Olsen and Michael Bodekaer,
inspired by the lightweight Sparrow email client for OS X
as an alternative to other existing email clients. Aside from the basic email features, the soft beta version included such features as the in-line reply, in-line attachment, a contact app, contacts search, PDF preview, keyboard shortcuts, quick reply, delete forever, etc.

In January 2013, Mailbird opened its beta to the public on an invite-only basis.
The release included features, such as nested folder structure, message download, English spell check, and Lifehacker and TechCrunch integrations. Connecting additional email accounts also became possible along with the ability to set a default identity.

On January 27, 2014, Mailbird 1.0 was released to the public. This version had IMAP support, keyboard navigation, and multiple account support feature. Additionally, a Speed Reader, Contact Manager, POP support, and more languages for spell check were added.

On March 17, 2015, Mailbird 2.0 was released with new features, such as Email Snooze, Video Meetings, and Unified Inbox Plus. Further integrations were added for Facebook, WhatsApp, Twitter, Veeting Rooms, Asana, and more.

By 2016, the app had been translated into several languages, including Hungarian and Chinese. Features, such as Undo Send, Import, Custom Cover were added, and the Contact Manager was updated.

The following releases have mostly seen bug fixes and feature improvements. New integrations were added, such as Moodo, ZeroBounce, Google Drive. In 2019, Mailbird was updated with Filters/Rules functionality.

In 2020, new features were introduced, such as the Native Calendar, Advanced Search, and Moving Emails Between Accounts.

Features

Multiple account support 
Mailbird supports all IMAP and POP3 accounts from different email providers, such as Gmail, Outlook, Yahoo Mail, Hotmail, Exchange, etc.

Email snooze 
Email Snooze provides users with an option to remove an email from the inbox for a set period of time. The snoozed email will return to the top of the inbox once a defined timer runs out.

Speed reader 
The Speed Reader feature shows the email text word-by-word on a blanc screen. The speed can be adjusted.

Native calendar 
The calendar feature provides typical views by day, week, and month and can also be opened in the inbox sidebar. Calendars from all email accounts in use can be viewed at the same time.

Advanced search 
Emails can be searched using operators and filters, such as file weight or “has attachments.”

Move emails between accounts 
Multiple account support provides functionality to move or copy emails from one account to another using the same methods as when moving or copying files from one folder to another.

LinkedIn lookup 
The Business subscription allows searching for and connecting with contacts on LinkedIn.

Email tracker 
Users can put a tracker on certain emails and see which recipients opened that email. If a recipient opens a tracked email, this information will show up to the sender.

In-line reply 
In-line reply is a default option in Mailbird that allows for adding comments to parts of an email. Comments are automatically highlighted, and the responder's name is added.

Localization 
Mailbird supports English and has been translated into 21 other languages.

Supported standards 
Mailbird supports standard email protocols:

 POP3 – a basic retrieval protocol that supports offline email use.
 IMAP – another retrieval protocol that allows using webmail accounts in Mailbird.
 SMTP – a protocol for email transmission.

App integrations 
Mailbird has a built-in browser that opens web applications inside its interface. The add-ons are organized inside a store-like section, in which the apps are installed by simply marking a checkbox.

 Chrome — enables in-app browsing
 Degoo — cloud storage with AI technology
 Dropbox — cloud-based storage
 Evernote — web and desktop notepad
 Feedly — application for news aggregation
 Google services — Drive applications, Calendar, Hangouts, and Keep
 Todoist — personal and team productivity management app
 Messengers — WhatsApp, Facebook Messenger, WeChat, Twitter
 Business blogs — TechCrunch, The Verge, Lifehacker, etc.
 Unroll.me — email subscription management
 Asana — personal and team project management app
 FollowUp.cc — Gmail integration for setting reminders and automatic replies
 Slack — communication app for teams

References

External links 

Email clients
Windows email clients